Flaugherty Run is a tributary of the Ohio River in Allegheny County, Pennsylvania, in the United States.

Course
Flaugherty Run begins in Moon Township, generally following Flaugherty Run Rd. and then McGovern Blvd. It flows northeast and reaches its confluence with the Ohio River at the Glenwillard Boat Club in Glenwillard.

Tributaries
Flaugherty Run has several named tributaries. In order from source to mouth, they are Becks Run, Boggs Run, and Spring Run It also has several unnamed tributaries.

Geography and geology

Watershed

History
At one point, Flaugherty Run crosses Brodhead Road, a road originally created by and subsequently named after General Daniel Brodhead when travelling between Fort Pitt (Pennsylvania) and Fort McIntosh (Pennsylvania) during the American Revolutionary War.  During the war, a soldier that stood post at the stream for several weeks died.  The soldier's name was Flaugherty, and the stream was thusly named.
Flaugherty Run was entered into the Geographic Names Information System on August 2, 1979. Its identifier in the Geographic Names Information System is 1188258.

See also
 List of rivers of Pennsylvania

References

Rivers of Allegheny County, Pennsylvania
Rivers of Pennsylvania